Ballad Health is a chain of hospitals headquartered in Johnson City, Tennessee. It includes facilities in Tennessee, and Virginia.

The healthcare system's website states that its service area includes 29 counties, some of which are in Kentucky and North Carolina.

History
It was created in 2018, when Mountain States Health Alliance and Wellmont Health Systems agreed to merge together. Due to the merger, it became the sole hospital organization in sections of the Appalachia region. The Federal Trade Commission (FTC) had reservations about the merger as portions of Appalachia would only have a single healthcare provider. However the company merged without FTC approval because the Tennessee Attorney General and the Tennessee Department of Health gave clearance for the hospital systems to merge under a Tennessee state law passed in 2015 that allowed hospital merges to occur if the systems could get a "certificate of public advantage" or COPA clearance, arguing that a merged hospital system could work if the area people had greater advantages under a merge despite fewer competing hospital options. Ballad also got a COPA in Virginia, which required it to keep its existing Virginia hospitals open.

In 2019 Ballad announced plans to reduce Level I care and NICU services at Holston Valley Medical Center, sparking protests.

Lee County Hospital was scheduled to reopen on July 1, 2021. In October 2019 Ballad's urgent care center in Lee County began operations.

Dennis Barry, who consulted for the Southwest Virginia Health Authority as a monitor, stated that the Ballad merger meant that healthcare access in portions of Virginia did not collapse during the COVID-19 pandemic.

Leadership 
Alan Levine is the Chairman and Chief Executive Officer for Ballad Health. Prior to assuming his role with Ballad Health, he worked in several healthcare-related organizations throughout the southeast. He is most notably remembered for his work with Health Management Associates in Broward Co., FL which was featured on 60 Minutes in a story called "The Cost of Admission" which explored the excessive greed of the for-profit company who pressured physicians to admit more and more patients without regard to medical need in order to increase profits]. The entire episode can be watched here. Mr. Levine has continued to cause controversy over seemingly unethical practices since coming to Ballad Health. Community resistance has been loud and visible, but he has managed to obtain the loyalty and support of many regional leaders.

Service area
The system's official service area includes the following counties in the Appalachia Highlands:
 Tennessee: Carter, Cocke, Greene, Hamblen, Hancock, Hawkins, Johnson, Sullivan, Unicoi, and Washington
 Virginia: Buchanan, Dickenson, Grayson, Lee, Russell, Scott, Smyth, Tazewell, Washington, Wise, and Wythe
 North Carolina: Ashe, Avery, Madison, Mitchell, Watauga, and Yancey
 Kentucky: Harlan and Letcher

Hospitals
 Tennessee
 Bristol Regional Medical Center (Bristol)
 Franklin Woods Community Hospital (Johnson City)
 Greeneville Community Hospital (Greeneville)
 Hancock County Hospital (Sneedville)
 Hawkins County Memorial Hospital (Rogersville)
 Holston Valley Medical Center (Kingsport)
 Indian Path Community Hospital (Kingsport)
 Johnson City Medical Center (Johnson City)
 Johnson County Community Hospital (Mountain City)
 Niswonger Children’s Hospital (Johnson City)
 Sycamore Shoals Hospital (Elizabethton)
 Unicoi County Hospital (Erwin)
 Woodridge Hospital (Johnson City)

 Virginia
 Dickenson Community Hospital (Clintwood)
 Johnston Memorial Hospital (Abingdon)
 Lee County Community Hospital (Pennington Gap)
 Lonesome Pine Hospital (Big Stone Gap)
 Norton Community Hospital (Norton)
 Russell County Hospital (Lebanon)
 Smyth County Community Hospital (Marion)

References

External links
 Ballad Health

Healthcare in Tennessee
Healthcare in Virginia
Healthcare in Kentucky
Healthcare in North Carolina
Medical and health organizations based in Tennessee
Johnson City, Tennessee
2018 establishments in Tennessee
Hospital networks in the United States
Appalachia